Manfred Werz (born May 15, 1933 in Dierdorf) is a German civil engineer and the former president of the Federal Association of Road and Traffic Engineers (Bundesvereinigung der Straßenbau- und Verkehrsingenieure) from 1990 to 1993 and Road Administration Rheinland-Pfalz (Straßenverwaltung Rheinland-Pfalz) (now known as Landesbetrieb Mobilität Rheinland-Pfalz) from 1995 to 1998 in Germany. In 1998, he earned the Wirtschaftsmedaille des Landes Rheinland-Pfalz, a prestigious award and acknowledgement for his work, handed by Rainer Brüderle, Minister of Economics and Transport of Rhineland-Palatinate at the time.

References 

Living people
1933 births
German civil engineers